Sher Bagga  is a 2022 Indian Punjabi-language, comedy-drama film directed by Jagdeep Sidhu under the banner of Ammy Virk Productions. The film is produced by Ammy Virk and Daljeet Thind. The film stars Ammy Virk, Sonam Bajwa and Nirmal Rishi in the lead roles. The film was released worldwide in cinemas on 24 June 2022.

Premise
Dilsher, a simple village man from Punjab, has set out to meet his fiancé in London. Before meeting her, he bumps into the hot headed Gulab, a single child of divorced parents, embittered by the experience of her parents and searching for true love. But their meeting takes an unconventional turn when they (unintentionally) end up sharing intimacy for one night. What follows is a story of realization for both as they experience that they are each other’s true love.

Cast
Ammy Virk as Dilsher Singh
Sonam Bajwa as Gulab Kaur
Nirmal Rishi as Bebe, Dilsher's grandmother 
Deep Sehgal
Kaka Kautki
Baninder Bunny
Rup Khatkar
Jasneet Kaur
Gurdiyal Singh

Production

Development
The film was announced in June 2021 with lead cast of Ammy Virk and Sonam Bajwa.

Filming
Principal photography of Sher Bagga began in July 2021. The film was shot in parts of England and Punjab.

Music
The music of the film is composed by Avvy Sra, Jaymeet, Sunny Vik and Oye Kunaal while the background score is composed by Sandeep Saxena.

Release and Marketing
The trailer of the film was released on 23 May 2022. The film was scheduled for a theatrical release on 10 June 2022 but was postponed due to the death of the singer Sidhu Moose Wala.
The film was released in theatres worldwide on 24 June 2022.

Reception
A critic from Times of India gave the film 4 out of 5 stars and said "the film is a pure love and a romantic ode to modern love".
A critic from The Tribune gave a positive review and said the film was written for Ayushmann Khurrana, but Ammy Virk-Sonam Bajwa jodi did complete justice to the film.

References

Punjabi-language Indian films
Films directed by Jagdeep Sidhu